The American Music Award for Favorite Adult Contemporary Album was first awarded in 1992, but discontinued since 1994.

1990s

American Music Awards
Awards established in 1992
Awards disestablished in 1994
Album awards